The House at 12–16 Corey Road in Brookline, Massachusetts is a distinctive local example of townhouses in an English Revival style with Shingle elements.  The townhouses were designed by Arthur H. Bowdith, a prominent local architect, and built in 1896 for Alan Arthur and Gardiner Shaw, two real estate agents.  The townhouses have steeply-pitched shingled gables, projecting diamond-pane windows, and bracketed bargeboard trim.

The houses were listed on the National Register of Historic Places in 1985.

See also
National Register of Historic Places listings in Brookline, Massachusetts

References

Houses in Brookline, Massachusetts
Houses completed in 1896
National Register of Historic Places in Brookline, Massachusetts
Houses on the National Register of Historic Places in Norfolk County, Massachusetts